The Santo Domingo Open or Santo Domingo International is an open badminton tournament held in Santo Domingo, Dominican Republic. The tournament has been an International Series level since 2003, but in 2013 categorized as a Future Series level from Badminton World Federation. Another tournament, Dominican Open is a Future Series level since 2018.

Previous winners

Santo Domingo Open

Dominican Open

Performances by nation

Santo Domingo Open

Dominican Open

References 

Badminton tournaments
Sports competitions in the Dominican Republic
Badminton tournaments in the Dominican Republic